Menegites sulphurea is a moth of the family Erebidae. It was described by Max Bartel in 1903. It is found in Cameroon, the Democratic Republic of the Congo, Ghana, Kenya, Liberia, Malawi, Rwanda and Uganda.

References

 

Spilosomina
Moths described in 1903